The 2013 Evolution Championship Series (commonly referred to as Evo 2013 or EVO 2013) was a fighting game event held at Paris Las Vegas on July 12–14. The event featured a major tournament for nine fighting games, including Super Street Fighter IV: Arcade Edition and Injustice: Gods Among Us. The event's Super Smash Bros. Melee livestream was controversially blocked by Nintendo of America, though the company decided to allow the tournament to be streamed after being faced with community backlash.

Background

Evo 2013 took place on July 12 to 14 in the Bally's Event Center and Grand Ballroom of the Paris Las Vegas Hotel and Casino. The event featured open registration for its tournaments for the first time. However, attendees had to purchase entrance passes to access the building. Tournaments held at the event were livestreamed on Twitch. The tournament was broadcast simultaneously in Japan through streaming service Nico Nico Douga.

Tournaments at Evo 2013 had a total of 3,538 unique competitors, a record over previous years. Evo Co-Founder Tom Cannon noted that the Evolution Championship Series grew too large for Las Vegas ballrooms in 2012, and that the organization decided to charge for seating during Sunday finals in order to counter this issue.

Games
Nine major tournaments were held at Evo 2013. The games played were:
Super Street Fighter IV: Arcade Edition 2012
Ultimate Marvel vs. Capcom 3
Super Smash Bros. Melee
Injustice: Gods Among Us
King of Fighters XIII
Tekken Tag Tournament 2
Street Fighter X Tekken 2013
Mortal Kombat
Persona 4 Arena

Nintendo's 2001 fighting game Super Smash Bros. Melee was added to the 2013 Evo roster after a fan-funded donation drive. Fans of the game raised over $94,000 USD to be donated towards breast cancer research in order to have the game played competitively at the event. However, a week before the event was to start, Nintendo of America denied Evo organizers the right to livestream the Super Smash Bros. Melee tournament on Twitch. Evo founder Joey Cuellar stated on eSports show Live On Three that the company not only tried to shut down the livestream, but also the Melee tournament itself. Nintendo reverted this decision after being faced with community backlash on social media.

Injustice: Gods Among Us was added to the roster "at the last minute" after its publisher, Warner Bros, offered to help Evo with the logistical issue of adding a ninth major tournament to the event. Though the organization has always been conservative when adding new games to the roster, Cannon said the public response to the idea of Injustice being added to the roster was highly positive.

A Skullgirls side-tournament took place at the event after fans raised $78,000 USD during the charity drive. Cannon noted that there were multiple Super Street Fighter 2 Turbo tournaments held during Evo 2013. The event also held an indie game showcase for the first time, in which independent game developers display their works.

Reveals
Capcom announced during a break in the Street Fighter tournament that the company would release four new characters for Super Street Fighter IV: Hugo, Poison, Rolento, and Elena, as a $15 USD add-on. Shortly before the tournament finals kicked off, Capcom revealed Ultra Street Fighter IV. During a presentation of Killer Instinct (2013), the crowd started booing when the Xbox One was mentioned as the game's exclusive console.

Warner Bros. announced Martian Manhunter as the fifth DLC character for Injustice: Gods Among Us along with a John Stewart costume for Green Lantern with Phil LaMarr voicing the costume instead of Adam Baldwin.

Tournament summary

The Street Fighter tournament at Evo 2013 finished off with Kun Xian Ho beating Tokido in the Grand Finals. Playing as Gen, Xian came in from the winner's bracket and defeated Tokido's Akuma without a bracket reset.

The Ultimate Marvel vs. Capcom 3 tournament featured various moments that were described as highly thrilling. The tournament was won by Job "Flocker" Figueroa, though second-place finisher Justin Wong received attention for his run through the tournament, including resetting the grand final after being sent to loser's bracket by Flocker and forcing a close final game in the grand finals reset. The Street Fighter X Tekken tournament was won by Infiltration for the second year in a row, beating Justin Wong in the finals. Infiltration's more aggressive playstyle proved effective against Wong's more conservative style.

Results

References

External links
Ars Technica on why Nintendo can legally shut down any Smash Bros. tournament it wants

Evolution Championship Series
2013 in sports in Nevada